Peter Duncan (born 15 April 1935) is a South African former swimmer. He competed at the 1952 Summer Olympics and the 1956 Summer Olympics.

References

External links
 

1935 births
Living people
South African male swimmers
Olympic swimmers of South Africa
Swimmers at the 1952 Summer Olympics
Swimmers at the 1956 Summer Olympics
Sportspeople from Pretoria
Swimmers at the 1954 British Empire and Commonwealth Games
Commonwealth Games medallists in swimming
Commonwealth Games silver medallists for South Africa
Commonwealth Games bronze medallists for South Africa
Medallists at the 1954 British Empire and Commonwealth Games